George Leonard Carlson  (1887 - September 26, 1962) was an illustrator and artist with numerous completed works, perhaps the most famous being the dust jacket for Gone with the Wind. He is cited by Harlan Ellison as a "cartoonist of the absurd, on a par with Winsor McCay, Geo. McManus, Rube Goldberg or Bill Holman." Comic book scholar Michael Barrier called him "a kind of George Herriman for little children". In the Harlan Ellison Hornbook preface to his essay on Carlson, Ellison relates how he contacted Carlson's daughters and attempted to get the material they sent him preserved in a museum or archive, to no avail. According to Paul Tumey of Fantagraphics, Carlson's book Draw Comics! Here's How - A Complete Book on Cartooning (Whitman, 1933) was included in an exhibit on Art Spiegelman in the Museum of Contemporary Art Detroit in 2009.

Two episodes of "The Pie-Face Prince of Old Pretzelburg" (from Jingle Jangle Comics 5 and 24) are included in A Smithsonian Book of Comic-book Comics ed. by J. Michael Barrier and Martin T. Williams. Another "Pie-Face Prince" episode is reprinted in The Toon Treasury of Classic Children's Comics, ed. by Art Spiegelman. "The Zheckered Zultan and His Three Little Zulteens" appears in The Golden Collection of Klassic Krazy Kool Kids Komics, ed. by historian Craig Yoe.

In October 2013, a two-part article on Carlson's career appeared in The Comics Journal. Calling Carlson "an under-appreciated, largely overlooked cartoonist, illustrator, game designer, and graphic artist extraordinaire" with a "playful, surreal world", writer Paul Tumey examined Carlson's life and work and announced the publication of Perfect Nonsense: The Chaotic Comics and Goofy Games of George Carlson by Daniel Yezbick (Fantagraphics, December 2013). The article references Ellison's essay and another he wrote for a 1990 Carlson tribute comic book published by Innovation, Mangle Tangle Tales #1. It also includes an extensive bibliography of Carlson's work.

A more scholarly analysis appears in Daniel Yezbick's 2007 "Riddles of Engagement: Narrative Play in the Children's Media and Comic Art of George Carlson".

Timeline of creative works

1917 - Illustrates The Magic Stone: Rainbow Fairy Stories with paintings
1917 - Cover illustration for Judge Magazine, July 14, 1917
1920 - Illustrates Swiss Fairy Tales by William Elliot Griffis 
1920 - Illustrates Jane and the Owl by Gene Stone
1921 - Illustrates Adventures of Jane by Gene Stone
1928 - Illustrates  The Adventures of Toby Spaniel
1929 - Creates a dust jacket for The Whirlwind
1931 - Provides black and white ink drawings and full color frontis for Fact and Story Reader - book eight
1933 - Authored Draw Comics! - Here's How - A Complete Book on Cartooning
1936 - Illustrated the original yellow dust jacket for Gone with the Wind
1937 - Writes and Illustrates Fun-Time Games, Puzzles, Stunts, Drawings, also Fun For Juniors, and also Points on Cartooning.
1939 - Illustrates "Uncle Wiggily and His Friends" by Howard R. Garis
1940 - Cover illustration for "Treasure Chest of Stephen Foster Songs" 
1942 - Begins work with Jingle Jangle Comics at its birth, creating covers and contributing comic strips such as "The Pie-Face Prince of Old Pretzelburg", contributed for 8 years every other month, two strips per contributed issue.
1949 - creates 1001 Riddles for Children
1953 - Creates book I Can Draw for young artists
1959 - Creates book Jokes & Riddles for young children

References

Sources
George L Carlson on Askart.com
 George Carlson at Toonopedia

Burials at Mountain Grove Cemetery, Bridgeport
American illustrators
1962 deaths
1887 births